John-Michael Kendall (born 1962)  is a Geophysicist and Professor in the Department of Earth Sciences at the University of Oxford.

Education
Kendall was educated at Queen's University in Kingston, Ontario where he was awarded a Bachelor of Science degree in 1984 and a PhD in 1991 supervised by Colin J. Thomson.

Career and research
Kendall's research interests are in geology, geophysics and seismology. Kendall has led field experiments in a range of geologic settings varying from the Arctic Archipelago, to Oman and Ethiopia.

Previously Kendall has worked for the Chevron Corporation in Canada, the Scripps Institution of Oceanography in the United States, the University of Toronto, the University of Leeds and the University of Bristol.

Awards and honours
Kendall served as president of the British Geophysical Association (BGA) and vice-president (Geophysics) of the Royal Astronomical Society (RAS). In 2019, he was elected a Fellow of the Royal Society (FRS) and in 2011 he was elected Fellow of the American Geophysical Union (AGU).

References

Fellows of the Royal Society
Geophysicists
Queen's University at Kingston alumni
Fellows of the American Geophysical Union
Academics of the University of Oxford
1962 births
Living people